= Mordellistena barberi =

Scientific classification
- Kingdom: Animalia
- Phylum: Arthropoda
- Clade: Pancrustacea
- Class: Insecta
- Order: Coleoptera
- Suborder: Polyphaga
- Infraorder: Cucujiformia
- Family: Mordellidae
- Genus: Mordellistena
- Species: M. barberi

Binomial name
- Mordellistena barberi Ray, 1937

Species of beetle

Mordellistena barberi is a species of beetle in the family Mordellidae. It was described in 1937 by Eugene Ray from Puerto Rico.

This beetle measures 1.65 mm (0.065 in) in length, or 2.3 mm (0.091 in) when including the anal stylus. The antennae are 0.5 mm (0.020 in) long.
